OurGrid is an opensource grid middleware based on a peer-to-peer architecture. OurGrid was mainly developed at the Federal University of Campina Grande (Brazil), which has run an OurGrid instance named "OurGrid" since December 2004. Anyone can freely join it to gain access to large amount of computational power and run parallel applications. This computational power is provided by the idle resources of all participants, and is shared in a way that makes those who contribute more get more when they need. Currently, the platform can be used to run any application whose tasks (i.e. parts that run on a single machine) do not communicate among themselves during execution, like most simulations, data mining and searching.

References

External links
 Official website
 The Register article about the project

Grid computing
Free and open-source software